The Stations of the Cross or the Way of the Cross, also known as the Way of Sorrows or the Via Crucis, refers to a series of images depicting Jesus Christ on the day of his crucifixion and accompanying prayers. The stations grew out of imitations of the Via Dolorosa in Jerusalem, which is a traditional processional route symbolising the actual path Jesus walked to Mount Calvary. The objective of the stations is to help the Christian faithful to make a spiritual pilgrimage through contemplation of the Passion of Christ. It has become one of the most popular devotions and the stations can be found in many Western Christian churches, including those in the Roman Catholic, Lutheran, Anglican, and Methodist traditions.

Commonly, a series of 14 images will be arranged in numbered order along a path, along which worshippers—individually or in a procession—move in order, stopping at each station to say prayers and engage in reflections associated with that station. These devotions are most common during Lent, especially on Good Friday, and reflect a spirit of reparation for the sufferings and insults that Jesus endured during his passion. As a physical devotion involving standing, kneeling and genuflections, the Stations of the Cross are tied with the Christian themes of repentance and mortification of the flesh.

The style, form, and placement of the stations vary widely. The typical stations are small plaques with reliefs or paintings placed around a church nave. Modern minimalist stations can be simple crosses with a numeral in the centre. Occasionally the faithful might say the stations of the cross without there being any image, such as when the pope leads the stations of the cross around the Colosseum in Rome on Good Friday.

History 

The Stations of the Cross originated in pilgrimage to Jerusalem and a desire to reproduce the Via Dolorosa. Imitating holy places was not a new concept. For example, the religious complex of Santo Stefano in Bologna, Italy, replicated the Church of the Holy Sepulchre and other religious sites, including the Mount of Olives and the Valley of Josaphat.

Following the siege of 1187, Jerusalem fell to the forces of Saladin, the first sultan of Egypt and Syria. Forty years later, members of the Franciscan religious order were allowed back into the Holy Land. Their founder, Saint Francis of Assisi, held the Passion of Christ in special veneration and is said to have been the first person to receive stigmata. In 1217, St. Francis also founded the Custody of the Holy Land to guard and promote the devotion to Christian holy places. The Franciscans' efforts were recognized when Pope Clement VI officially proclaimed them the custodians of holy places in 1342. Although several travelers who visited the Holy Land during the 12–14th centuries (e.g. Riccoldo da Monte di Croce, Burchard of Mount Sion, and James of Verona), mention a "Via Sacra", i.e. a settled route that pilgrims followed, there is nothing in their accounts to identify this with the Way of the Cross, as we understand it. The earliest use of the word "stations", as applied to the accustomed halting-places along the Via Sacra at Jerusalem, occurs in the narrative of an English pilgrim, William Wey, who visited the Holy Land in the mid-15th century and described pilgrims following the footsteps of Christ to Golgotha. In 1521, a book called Geystlich Strass (German: "spiritual road") was printed with illustrations of the stations in the Holy Land.

During the 15th and 16th centuries, the Franciscans began to build a series of outdoor shrines in Europe to duplicate their counterparts in the Holy Land.  The number of stations at these shrines varied between seven and thirty; seven was common. These were usually placed, often in small buildings, along the approach to a church, as in a set of 1490 by Adam Kraft, leading to the Johanniskirche in Nuremberg.  A number of rural examples were established as attractions in their own right, usually on attractive wooded hills.  These include the Sacro Monte di Domodossola (1657) and Sacro Monte di Belmonte (1712), and form part of the Sacri Monti of Piedmont and Lombardy World Heritage Site, together with other examples on different devotional themes.  The sculptures at these sites are very elaborate and often nearly life-size. Remnants of these sites are often referred to as calvary hills.

In 1686, in answer to their petition, Pope Innocent XI granted to the Franciscans the right to erect stations within their churches.  In 1731, Pope Clement XII extended to all churches the right to have the stations, provided that a Franciscan father erected them, with the consent of the local bishop.  At the same time the number of stations was fixed at fourteen.  In 1857, the bishops of England were allowed to erect the stations by themselves, without the intervention of a Franciscan priest, and in 1862 this right was extended to bishops throughout the church.

Stations

The early set of seven scenes was usually numbers 2, 3, 4, 6, 7, 11 and 14 from the list below. From the late 16th century to the present, the standard complement has consisted of 14 pictures or sculptures depicting the following scenes:
 Jesus is condemned to death
 Jesus takes up his Cross
 Jesus falls the first time
 Jesus meets his Mother
 Simon of Cyrene helps Jesus carry the Cross
 Veronica wipes the face of Jesus
 Jesus falls for the second time
 Jesus meets the women of Jerusalem
 Jesus falls for the third time
 Jesus is stripped of his garments (sometimes called the "Division of Robes")
 Jesus is nailed to the Cross
 Jesus dies on the Cross
 Jesus is taken down from the Cross
 Jesus is laid in the tomb

Although not traditionally part of the Stations, the Resurrection of Jesus is sometimes included as an unofficial fifteenth station. One very different version, called the Via Lucis ("Way of Light"), comprising the Fourteen Stations of Light or Stations of the Resurrection, starts Jesus rising from the dead and ends with Pentecost.

Scriptural form

Out of the fourteen traditional Stations of the Cross, only eight have a clear scriptural foundation. Station 4 appears out of order from scripture; Jesus's mother is present at the crucifixion but is only mentioned after Jesus is nailed to the cross and before he dies (between stations 11 and 12). The scriptures contain no accounts whatsoever of any woman wiping Jesus's face nor of Jesus falling as stated in Stations 3, 6, 7 and 9. Station 13 (Jesus's body being taken down off the cross and laid in the arms of his mother Mary) differs from the gospels' record, which states that Joseph of Arimathea took Jesus down from the cross and buried him.

To provide a version of this devotion more closely aligned with the biblical accounts, Pope John Paul II introduced a new form of devotion, called the Scriptural Way of the Cross, on Good Friday 1991. He celebrated that form many times but not exclusively at the Colosseum in Italy, using the following sequence (as published by the United States Catholic Conference of Bishops):

 Jesus prays in the Garden of Gethsemane;
 Jesus is betrayed by Judas and arrested;
 Jesus is condemned by the Sanhedrin;
 Jesus is denied by Peter 3 times;
 Jesus is judged by Pilate;
 Jesus is scourged and crowned with thorns;
 Jesus takes up his cross;
 Jesus is helped by Simon of Cyrene to carry his cross;
 Jesus meets the women of Jerusalem;
 Jesus is crucified;
 Jesus promises his kingdom to the repentant thief;
 Jesus entrusts Mary and John to each other;
 Jesus dies on the cross; and
 Jesus is laid in the tomb.
In 2007, Pope Benedict XVI approved this set of stations for meditation and public celebration.

The New Way of the Cross (Philippines)
Another set of Stations are being used by the Catholic Church in the Philippines. Filipinos use this set during Visita Iglesia, which is usually done every Holy Week.

 The Last Supper
 The Agony in Gethsemane
 Jesus Before the Sanhedrin
 Jesus is scourged and crowned with thorns
 Jesus Receives His Cross
 Jesus Falls under the weight of the Cross
 Simon of Cyrene Helps Jesus carry the Cross
 Jesus meets the women of Jerusalem
 Jesus is nailed to the Cross
 The Repentant Thief
 Mary and John at the Foot of the Cross
 Jesus dies on the Cross
 Jesus is laid in His Tomb
 Jesus rises from the Dead

Modern usage

In the Roman Catholic Church, the devotion may be conducted personally by the faithful, making their way from one station to another and saying the prayers, or by having an officiating celebrant move from cross to cross while the faithful make the responses. The stations themselves must consist of, at the very least, fourteen wooden crosses—pictures alone do not suffice—and they must be blessed by someone with the authority to erect stations.

Pope John Paul II led an annual public prayer of the Stations of the Cross at the Roman Colosseum on Good Friday. Originally, the pope himself carried the cross from station to station, but in his last years when age and infirmity limited his strength, John Paul presided over the celebration from a stage on the Palatine Hill, while others carried the cross. Just days prior to his death in 2005, Pope John Paul II observed the Stations of the Cross from his private chapel. Each year a different person is invited to write the meditation texts for the Stations. Past composers of the Papal Stations include several non-Catholics. The pope himself wrote the texts for the Great Jubilee in 2000 and used the traditional Stations.

The celebration of the Stations of the Cross is especially common on the Fridays of Lent, especially Good Friday. Community celebrations are usually accompanied by various songs and prayers. Particularly common as musical accompaniment is the  Stabat Mater.  At the end of each station the Adoramus Te is sometimes sung. The Alleluia is also sung, except during Lent.

Structurally, Mel Gibson's 2004 film, The Passion of the Christ, follows the Stations of the Cross.

Debates

Place of Christ's resurrection
Some modern liturgists say the traditional Stations of the Cross are incomplete without a final scene depicting the empty tomb and the resurrection of Jesus because Jesus' rising from the dead was an integral part of his salvific work on Earth. Advocates of the traditional form of the Stations ending with the body of Jesus being placed in the tomb say the Stations are intended as a meditation on the atoning death of Jesus, and not as a complete picture of his life, death, and resurrection. Another point of contention, at least between some ranking liturgists and traditionalists, is (the use of) the "New Way of the Cross" being recited exclusively in the Philippines and by Filipinos abroad.

The Stations of the Resurrection (also known by the Latin name of Via Lucis, Way of Light) are used in some churches at Eastertide to meditate on the Resurrection and Ascension of Jesus Christ.

Music
Franz Liszt wrote a Via Crucis for choir, soloists and piano or organ or harmonium in 1879. In 1931, French organist Marcel Dupré improvised and transcribed musical meditations based on fourteen poems by Paul Claudel, one for each station.
Peter Maxwell Davies's Vesalii Icones (1969), for male dancer, solo cello and instrumental ensemble, brings together the Stations of the Cross and a series of drawings from the anatomical treatise De humani corporis fabrica (1543) by the Belgian physician Andreas van Wesel (Vesalius). In Davies's sequence, the final "station" represents the Resurrection, but of Antichrist, the composer's moral point being the need to distinguish what is false from what is real.
David Bowie regarded his 1976 song "Station to Station" as "very much concerned with the stations of the cross". Paweł Łukaszewski wrote Via Crucis in 2000 and it was premiered by the Wrocław Opera on Good Friday March 30, 2018, and transmitted on TVP Kultura. Stefano Vagnini's 2002 modular oratorio, Via Crucis, is a composition for organ, computer, choir, string orchestra and brass quartet. Italian composer Fabio Mengozzi released his electronic album Via crucis in 2022.

As the Stations of the Cross are prayed during the season of Lent in Catholic churches, each station is traditionally followed by a verse of the Stabat Mater, composed in the 13th century by Franciscan Jacopone da Todi.  James Matthew Wilson's poetic sequence, The Stations of the Cross, is written in the same meter as da Todi's poem.

Literature
Dimitris Lyacos' third part of the Poena Damni trilogy, The First Death, is divided in fourteen sections in order to emphasise the "Via Dolorosa" of its marooned protagonist during his ascent on the mount of the island which constitutes the setting of the work.

Gallery

See also
 Acts of Reparation to Jesus Christ
 Life of Jesus in the New Testament
 Seven Sorrows of Mary
 Sayings of Jesus on the cross
 Three Hours' Agony
 Via Lucis

References

External links

 Scriptural Stations of the Cross from the United States Conference of Catholic Bishops
  The Way Of The Cross: Presentation (historical development; present form, both traditional and scriptural), from the official Vatican website (accessed 19 May 2020)
 Via Crucis celebration texts used by the Vatican on Good Fridays since 1991 from the official Vatican website
 Video: Corine Schleif. Adam Kraft's Seven Falls of Christ. Walking the History of Emotions in Nuremberg. Part 1
 Video: Corine Schleif. Adam Kraft's Seven Falls of Christ. Walking the History of Emotions in Nuremberg. Part 2
 "Way of the Cross" article from The Catholic Encyclopedia

 
Christian iconography
Christian terminology
Cross symbols
Passion of Jesus in art by theme
Franciscan spirituality
Catholic art by subject
Catholic devotions
Sorrowful Mysteries